Events in the year 1920 in Brazil.

Incumbents

Federal government 
 President: Epitácio Pessoa 
 Vice President: Delfim Moreira (until 1 July); vacant (1 July to 10 November); Francisco Álvaro Bueno de Paiva (from 10 November)

Governors 
 Alagoas: José Fernandes de Barros Lima 
 Amazonas: Pedro de Alcântara Bacelar
 Bahia: Antônio Ferrão Muniz de Aragão, then José Joaquim Seabra
 Ceará: 
 till 12 July: João Tomé de Sabóia e Silva
 from 12 12 July: Justiniano de Serpa
 Goiás: João Alves de Castro
 Maranhão: Urbano Santos
 Mato Grosso: Francisco de Aquino Correia
 Minas Gerais: Artur Bernardes
 Pará: Lauro Sodré
 Paraíba: 
 till 22 October: Francisco Camilo de Holanda
 from 22 October: Sólon Barbosa de Lucena
 Paraná: 
 Afonso Camargo
 Caetano Munhoz da Rocha
 Pernambuco:
 till 28 October: José Rufino Bezerra Cavalcanti
 from 28 October: Otávio Hamilton Tavares Barreto
 Piauí:
 till 1 July: Eurípedes Clementino de Aguiar
 from 1 July: João Luís Ferreira
 Rio Grande do Norte: Joaquim Ferreira Chaves
 Rio Grande do Sul: Antônio Augusto Borges de Medeiros
 Santa Catarina:
 São Paulo: 
 Sergipe:

Vice governors 
 Rio Grande do Norte:
 São Paulo:

Events 
20 April - Opening ceremony of the 1920 Summer Olympics in Antwerp, at which Brazil competes for the first time. Sport shooter Guilherme Paraense is the first Brazilian to win a gold medal.

Arts and culture

Books
Monteiro Lobato writes the first of his Sítio do Picapau Amarelo novel series.

Films
Coração de Gaúcho, directed by and starring Luiz de Barros 
O Crime de Cravinhos, directed by Arturo Carrari and starring Rodolfo Arena.
O Garimpeiro, directed by and starring Vittorio Capellaro

Births 
9 January - João Cabral de Melo Neto, poet and diplomat (died 1999)
21 April - Anselmo Duarte, actor, screenwriter and film director (died 2009)
26 July - Celso Furtado (died 2004)

Deaths 
26 March - Prince Luís of Orléans-Braganza, claimant to the Brazilian throne (born 1878; rheumatism) 
1 July - Delfim Moreira, politician (born 1868)
16 October - Alberto Nepomuceno, conductor and composer (born 1864)

References

See also 
1920 in Brazilian football

 
1920s in Brazil
Years of the 20th century in Brazil
Brazil
Brazil